XHSCAJ-FM is a community radio station on 97.5 FM in Etzatlán, Jalisco. The station is owned by the civil association Comunicación y Cultura de Etzatlán 07, A.C.

History
Comunicación y Cultura de Etzatlán 07 filed for a community station on October 3, 2016. The IFT approved its award on October 22, 2018.

References

Radio stations in Jalisco
Community radio stations in Mexico
Radio stations established in 2018